The Ligue Provinciale de Basketball de Kinshasa (in English: Kinshasa Provincial Basketball League), better known as the Liprobakin, is an annual basketball competition for teams in Kinshasa, Democratic Republic of the Congo.

The top two teams qualify for each season of the Coupe du Congo, where the Kinshasa teams meet teams from other regions of the country.

Men's teams 
In the 2022 season, the following 20 teams played in the Liprobakin:

 Espoir Fukash
 Terreur
 SCTP
 Héritage des Vainqueurs
 Opportunidade
 Le Figuier
 New Generation
 Binza City
 AS Police
 Canon de Ndjili
 Mak
 Jeunesse
 Avenir
 DCMP
 Ngaliema
 City Kauka
 Ballers
 Don Bosco
 Debonhomme
 Molokai

Men's champions

Women's champions

References 

Basketball in the Democratic Republic of the Congo